Israel–Papua New Guinea relations are bilateral relations between Israel and Papua New Guinea. Israel and Papua New Guinea established diplomatic relations in 1978, about three years after Papua New Guinea was granted independence.

History

Israel's ambassador to Australia acts as non-resident ambassador to Papua New Guinea. While Papua New Guinea does not have an embassy in Israel, it has a consulate in Ramat HaSharon, with jurisdiction over the Tel Aviv Metropolitan Area. Since 2007, Ya'akov Weiss has been the Honorary Consul General of Papua New Guinea to Israel, and acts as the diplomatic representative of Papua New Guinea to Israel.

In November 2012, the Papua New Guinea government abstained in the vote on United Nations General Assembly resolution 67/19 recognizing Palestine as a non-member state.

On a visit to Israel, in October 2013, Prime Minister of Papua New Guinea, Peter O'Neill, planted a tree in Jerusalem. During the visit O'Neill stated: "Planting a tree symbolizes that the world has a future and that we all have life."

In 2020 Peter O'Neill was arrested by police in Port Moresby after allegations that he had purchased 2 generators from Israel without Parliamentary approval.

Cultural relations
There are claims that the Gogodala people in Western Province of Papua New Guinea are the descendants of a lost tribe of Israel. The claims have been analysed by Florida International University religious studies professor Tudor Parfitt.

The Huli culture of Hela people in Papua New Guinea is also reportedly similar to Jewish culture.

See also
 Foreign relations of Israel
 Foreign relations of Papua New Guinea
 Israel–Federated States of Micronesia relations
 International recognition of Israel

References

Further reading

External links
Honorary Consulate of Papua New Guinea in Israel

 
Papua New Guinea
Bilateral relations of Papua New Guinea